In the United States, it is a governing body of a utility. In Canada, it is a utility, not a regulatory body.

Canada
In Canada, a public utilities commission (PUC) is a public utility owned and operated by a municipal or local government under the oversight of one or more elected commissioners. It is not a regulatory body. Its role is analogous to a municipal utility district or public utility district in the US.
 Brantford Public Utilities Commission
 Kitchener Public Utilities Commission

Regulatory bodies 
The utility that is being regulated may be owned by the consumers that it serves, a mutual utility like a public utility district, a state-owned utility, or it may be a stockholder owned utility either publicly traded on a stock exchange or closely held among just a few investors.

These utilities often operate as legal monopolies, which means that they do not compete in a marketplace but are instead regulated by commissions to ensure fair pricing.

Countries
Americas
 Caribbean: Organisation of Caribbean Utility Regulators (OOCUR)
 Costa Rica: Costa Rica Public Utilities Commission
Dominican Republic: c Utilities Commission 
 Bahamas: Bahamas Public Utilities Commission
 Belize: Belize Public Utilities Commission
 Chile: Superintendencia de Servicios Sanitarios de Chile
Europe
 France: Commission de Régulation de l'Energie
Africa
 Ghana: Public Utility Regulation Council of Ghana (PURC)
Asia
 Sri Lanka: Public Utilities Commission of Sri Lanka

United States

In the United States, a utilities commission, utility regulatory commission (URC), public utilities commission (PUC), or public service commission (PSC) is a governing body that regulates the rates and services of a public utility, such as an electric utility. In some cases, government bodies with the title "public service commission" may be civil service oversight bodies, rather than utilities regulators.

The National Association of Regulatory Utility Commissioners is the national association representing the interests of the public utilities commissions in all 50 states. The Interstate Commerce Commission and Federal Communications Commission perform similar functions in their respective fields in the United States.

Elected by district
 Louisiana Public Service Commission
 Mississippi Public Service Commission
 Montana Public Service Commission
 Nebraska Public Service Commission
 New Mexico Public Regulation Commission

Elected at-large
 Alabama Public Service Commission
 Arizona Corporation Commission
 Georgia Public Service Commission
 New England Conference of Public Utilities
 North Dakota Public Service Commission
 Oklahoma Corporation Commission
 South Dakota Public Utilities Commission

Legislative appointment
 South Carolina Public Service Commission
 Virginia State Corporation Commission

Appointed by the governor
 Regulatory Commission of Alaska
 Arkansas Public Service Commission 
 California Public Utilities Commission 
 San Francisco Public Utilities Commission nominated by the Mayor of San Francisco and confirmed by the San Francisco Board of Supervisors
 Colorado Public Utilities Commission
 Connecticut
 Connecticut Department of Energy and Environmental Protection
 Connecticut Public Utilities Regulatory Authority
 Connecticut Siting Council
 Delaware Public Service Commission
 District of Columbia Public Service Commission
 Florida Public Service Commission
 Hawaii Public Utilities Commission
 Idaho Public Utilities Commission
 Illinois Commerce Commission
 Indiana Utility Regulatory Commission
 Iowa Utilities Board
 Kansas Corporation Commission
 Kentucky Public Service Commission
 Maine Public Utilities Commission
 Maryland Public Service Commission
 Massachusetts Department of Public Utilities
 Massachusetts Department of Telecommunications and Cable
 Michigan Public Service Commission
 Minnesota Public Utilities Commission
 Missouri Public Service Commission
 Nevada Public Utilities Commission
 New Hampshire Public Utilities Commission
 New Jersey Board of Public Utilities
 New York Public Service Commission
 North Carolina Utilities Commission
 Public Utilities Commission of Ohio
 Oregon Public Utility Commission 
 Pennsylvania Public Utility Commission
 Rhode Island Public Utilities Commission
 Tennessee Public Service Commission (1897-1996)
 Tennessee Regulatory Authority (since 1996)
 Texas Public Utility Commission
 Utah Public Service Commission
 Vermont
 Vermont Department of Public Service
 Vermont Public Utility Commission
 Virgin Islands Public Services Commission
 Washington Utilities and Transportation Commission
 West Virginia Public Service Commission
 Public Service Commission of Wisconsin
 Wyoming Public Service Commission

Canada
 Ontario Energy Board
 British Columbia Utilities Commission
 Nova Scotia Utility and Review Board
 Board of Commissioners of Public Utilities
 Island Regulatory and Appeals Commission
 New Brunswick Energy and Utilities Board
 Manitoba Public Utilities Board

References

External links 
 Public Service Commissioner (state executive office) - List of current commissioners from Ballotpedia
 List of regulatory commissions  by state compiled by the National Association of Regulatory Utility Commissioners.

 
Economics of regulation
Public utilities
Government agencies by type